The Kīngitanga, also known as the Māori King Movement, is an indigenous New Zealand elected monarchy established by the Tainui and other iwi in 1858 in an attempt to unify Māori tribes against encroachment on their territory by British settlers.

It has used many flags since its founding, including some similar to British naval ensigns.

See also
Kīngitanga
Flags of New Zealand

References

Māori politics